This is a directory of patriarchs, archbishops, and bishops across various Christian denominations. To find an individual who was a bishop, see the most relevant article linked below or :Category:Bishops.

Lists

Catholic 
 Bishop in the Catholic Church
 Catholic Church hierarchy
 List of bishops and prince-bishops of Liège
 List of Catholic archdioceses (by country and continent)
 List of Catholic bishops in the Philippines
 List of Catholic bishops in the United States
 List of Catholic bishops of India
 List of Catholic dioceses (alphabetical) (including archdioceses) (in the world)
 List of Catholic dioceses (structured view) (including archdioceses) (in the world)
 List of living cardinals (sortable by name, country, and birthdate)
 List of popes

Eastern Orthodox 
 List of American and Canadian Orthodox bishops
 List of bishops and archbishops of Novgorod
 List of Eastern Orthodox bishops and archbishops
 List of heads of the Serbian Orthodox Church
 List of Metropolitans and Patriarchs of Moscow
 List of primates of the Orthodox Church in America

Oriental Orthodox 
 List of Abunas of Eritrea
 List of Abunas of Ethiopia
 List of Armenian catholicoi of Cilicia
 List of Armenian patriarchs of Constantinople
 List of Armenian patriarchs of Jerusalem
 List of catholicoi of all Armenians
 List of Caucasian Albanian catholicoi
 List of Coptic Orthodox Popes of Alexandria
 List of maphrians
 List of metropolitans of the Indian Orthodox Church
 List of patriarchs of Eritrea
 List of Syriac Orthodox Patriarchs of Antioch

Protestant 
 List of Anglican dioceses
 List of current Anglican Primates
 List of bishops of the Church of England
 List of bishops of the Episcopal Church in the United States of America
 List of presiding bishops in the Episcopal Church in the United States of America
 List of Lutheran dioceses and archdioceses
 List of bishops of the Anglican Church in North America
 List of bishops of the Reformed Episcopal Church
 List of bishops of the United Methodist Church
 List of Charismatic Episcopal Church bishops

See also 
 Patriarch
 Cardinal
 Archbishop
 Bishop
 Resident Bishop (United Methodist)
 Diocese
 Lists of office-holders
 Ecclesiastical polity (church governance)
 Congregationalist polity
 Episcopal polity
 Presbyterian polity

External links 
 All Catholic bishops, archbishops, patriarchs and cardinals by GCatholic
 Catholic bishops and their apostolic succession Catholic Hierarchy
 Independent Movement Database – Database of Independent Bishops and Priest
 The World of Autocephalous Churches
 The Council of Bishops of the United Methodist Church

Bishops